Sir Garet 'Tiger' Orlanda Finlayson OBE (born 4 August 1937 in Andros) is a Bahamian business magnate.

The son of Hastings Finlayson, a tailor, and Maud (née Rolle) Finlayson, Tiger Finlayson, is the most successful black businessman in the Bahamas. Finlayson owns more than half the businesses on Bay Street, the Bahamas' leading shopping street. Previously, Bay Street was wholly owned by white business merchants known as the Bay Street Boys.

Finlayson owns leading Bahamian businesses Solomon Mines (luxury retail goods), Burns House and Butler & Sands (liquor stores). Over the years, Finlayson's business concerns have included car dealerships, hotels, furniture, office products and restaurant businesses.

Finlayson's acquisition of Solomon Mines in 2004-2005, however, was less successful with closures and the loss of jobs in 2015.

A philanthropist, Finlayson has donated millions of dollars in scholarships, to allow young people to attend university, something Finlayson himself never did.

In 1999, Finlayson was made an Officer of the Order of the British Empire (OBE) for services to the economic growth and development of the Bahamas.

Finlayson was married to Lady Rowena Frances Finlayson (née Rolle), with whom he had four children: Tanya Finlayson-Tynes, Rae Finlayson, Nikki Finlayson-Boeuf, and Mark Finlayson.

References

External links
 Garet Tiger Finlayson at Samana College website

Bahamian businesspeople
Living people
1938 births
People from South Andros
Officers of the Order of the British Empire